Willfully Whimsical is a painting by Lisa Corinne Davis. It is in the collection of the Philadelphia Museum of Art in Philadelphia, Pennsylvania in the United States.

Completed in 2006, Davis used oil paint and collage to on a wood panel to create a complex, abstract painting.

Willfully Whimsical was gifted to the Philadelphia Museum of Art by Davis in 2008.

References

2006 paintings
Paintings by Lisa Corinne Davis
21st-century paintings
Paintings in the collection of the Philadelphia Museum of Art